Tatarstan — New Age is a political group in the State Council of Tatarstan. Formed by former United Russia members who broke away from the party, it is led by Rinat Zakirov while State Council Chairman Farid Mukhametshin is also affiliated with the group. Its policies include mild Tatar nationalism, the expansion of social welfare, and environmentalism.

It is generally supportive of Vladimir Putin and his policies.

References

Politics of Tatarstan